Vitomiricë is a village in the municipality of Peja.

History
During World War II, Vitomirica was one of the many settlements in Kosovo where the Serb civilian population was persecuted and killed by Albanian paramilitaries.

Notes

References 

Villages in Peja